The 2014 Brisbane International was a joint 2014 ATP World Tour and 2014 WTA Tour tennis tournament, played on outdoor hard courts in Brisbane, Queensland. It was the sixth edition of the tournament and took place at the Queensland Tennis Centre in Tennyson. It was held from 29 December 2013 to 5 January 2014 and was part of the Australian Open Series in preparation for the first Grand Slam of the year.

In a major coup for the tournament, it was announced on 24 July 2013 that former world no. 1 and 17-time Grand Slam champion Roger Federer had committed to the event for the first time, thus breaking from his tradition of beginning the season in the Middle East. This announcement was dubbed "the biggest announcement in the history of the Brisbane International". Defending champion Serena Williams, two-time Australian Open champion Victoria Azarenka, 2013 Wimbledon finalist Sabine Lisicki, former world number ones Caroline Wozniacki and Jelena Janković and former ATP world No. 1 Lleyton Hewitt were also big drawcards for the event.

Points and prize money

Point distribution

Prize money 

1 Qualifiers prize money is also the Round of 32 prize money
* per team

ATP singles main-draw entrants

Seeds 

1 Rankings as of December 23, 2013

Other entrants 
The following players received wildcards into the singles main draw:
  James Duckworth
  Samuel Groth

The following players received entry from the qualifying draw:
  Thanasi Kokkinakis
  Yūichi Sugita
  Ryan Harrison
  Marius Copil

The following players received entry as a lucky losers:
  Pierre-Hugues Herbert
  Alex Kuznetsov

Withdrawals
Before the tournament
  Kevin Anderson (illness) → replaced by  Pierre-Hugues Herbert
  Nick Kyrgios (shoulder injury) → replaced by  Alex Kuznetsov
  Jürgen Melzer → replaced by  Matthew Ebden

ATP doubles main-draw entrants

Seeds 

1 Rankings as of December 23, 2013

Other entrants 
The following pairs received wildcards into the doubles main draw:
  Matthew Ebden /  Thanasi Kokkinakis
  Chris Guccione /  Lleyton Hewitt

WTA singles main-draw entrants

Seeds 

1 Rankings as of December 23, 2013

Other entrants 
The following players received wildcards into the singles main draw:
  Casey Dellacqua
  Olivia Rogowska
The following players received entry from the qualifying draw:
  Ashleigh Barty
  Alla Kudryavtseva
  Alexandra Panova
  Heather Watson
The following player received entry as a lucky loser:
  Hsieh Su-wei

Withdrawals
Before the tournament
  Caroline Wozniacki (shoulder injury) → replaced by  Hsieh Su-wei
During the tournament
  Ashleigh Barty (left abductor injury)
  Sabine Lisicki (illness)

Retirements
  Anastasia Pavlyuchenkova (left thigh injury)

WTA doubles main-draw entrants

Seeds 

1 Rankings as of December 23, 2013

Other entrants 
The following pairs received wildcards into the doubles main draw:
  Olivia Rogowska /  Monique Adamczak
  Francesca Schiavone /  Carla Suárez Navarro

Withdrawals
During the tournament
  Ashleigh Barty (left adductor injury)

Champions

Men's singles 

  Lleyton Hewitt def.  Roger Federer, 6–1, 4–6, 6–3

Women's singles 

  Serena Williams def.  Victoria Azarenka, 6–4, 7–5

Men's doubles 

  Mariusz Fyrstenberg /  Daniel Nestor def.  Juan Sebastián Cabal /  Robert Farah, 6–7(4–7), 6–4, [10–7]

Women's doubles 

  Alla Kudryavtseva /  Anastasia Rodionova def.  Kristina Mladenovic /  Galina Voskoboeva, 6–3, 6–1

References

External links 
 

 
2014 ATP World Tour
2014 WTA Tour
2014 in Australian tennis
2014
December 2013 sports events in Australia
January 2014 sports events in Australia